Elections to both the Regional Council and General Council were held in Réunion on 22 March 1992, as part of the French regional elections. The Free Dom party emerged as the largest in the Regional Council, winning 17 of the 45 seats.

Results

Regional Council

General Council

Aftermath
Following the elections, Free Dom formed an alliance with Communist Party, with the two holding 26 seats. Free Dom leader Camille Sudre was subsequently elected President of the Council with a majority of 27 votes.

However, the Socialist Party launched an appeal against the election results, make accusations of media bias due to Radio Free-DOM, owned by Sudre, had campaigned in his favour. In May 1993 the French Conseil d'Etat annulled the results of the elections. Fresh elections were held the following month.

References

Reunion
Reunion
Elections in Réunion
1992 in Réunion
March 1992 events in Africa
Election and referendum articles with incomplete results